The 2009 Croatian Figure Skating Championships ( took place between December 20 and 21, 2008 in Zagreb. Skaters competed in the disciplines of men's singles and ladies' singles.

Senior results

Men

Ladies

External links
 results

Croatian Figure Skating Championships
2008 in figure skating
Croatian Figure Skating Championships, 2009